Massandra Accords is a set four official agreements that were signed on 3 September 1993 between Ukraine and the Russian Federation as result of negotiations that took place in Ukrainian government official residence Massandra Palace in Yalta, Ukraine. The agreements related to settlement on issues of utilization of nuclear weapons located on territory of Ukraine.

 Protocol on settlement of issues of Black Sea Fleet (signed in Moscow)
 Basic principles of utilization of nuclear weapon of Strategic Nuclear Forces located in Ukraine
 Agreement between the government of Russian Federation and the government of Ukraine on utilization of nuclear warheads
 Agreement between Ukraine and the Russian Federation on implementation of assured and authoritative supervision for operation of strategic missile systems of Strategic Forces located on their territories

See also
 Lisbon Protocol (1992)
 Budapest Memorandum (1994)

References

1993 in Ukraine
Treaties concluded in 1993
Treaties entered into force in 1993
Treaties of Ukraine
Treaties of Russia
Russia–Ukraine relations
Military installations of Russia
1993 in international relations
Russian Navy